Arcimboldo is the surname of a number of notable Italian people.

Giovanni Arcimboldi (died 1488), Cardinal of Novara and Cardinal of Milan
Guido Antonio Arcimboldi (1428–1497) was a nobleman and a Roman Catholic prelate
Giovanni Angelo Arcimboldi (1485–1555), Bishop of Novara (1526–1550) and Archbishop of Milan (1550–1555)
Giuseppe Arcimboldo (also spelled Arcimboldi) (1526 or 1527 – 11 July 1593), painter

See also
Archibald,  a Germanic masculine given name
Archimboldi, a fictional character in the novel 2666 (2004) by Roberto Bolaño